The 2007 Navy Midshipmen football team represented the United States Naval Academy (USNA) as an independent during the 2007 NCAA Division I FBS football season. The team was led by sixth-year head coach Paul Johnson until he accepted the head coaching position at Georgia Tech prior to the team's final game of the season. Offensive line coach Ken Niumatalolo was first promoted to interim head coach and then named as the team's permanent head coach.

After beginning the season with a 4–4 record through the first eight games, including a loss to Football Championship Subdivision (FCS) foe Delaware, the Midshipmen broke a 43-year losing streak in the Navy–Notre Dame football rivalry in the 2007 Navy vs. Notre Dame football game by winning in triple overtime. The next week, the team became bowl eligible by winning its sixth game of the season in the 2007 Navy vs. North Texas football game, which set a record for the most points scored in a regulation-length FBS college football game. The Midshipmen finished the regular season with an 8–4 record and secured a berth in the 2007 Poinsettia Bowl, which had a single-year tie-in with the USNA. The other tie-in was with the Mountain West Conference (MWC). In a close game that came down to the final seconds, Navy lost the game to the Utah Utes with a score of 35–32.

Schedule

Game summaries

Notre Dame

Roster

References

Navy
Navy Midshipmen football seasons
Navy Midshipmen football